Bhagavathipuram Railway Gate is a 1983 Indian Tamil-language film written and directed by R. Selvaraj. The film stars Karthik and Rajyalakshmi. It was released on 14 April 1983.

Plot

Cast 
Karthik
Rajyalakshmi
Thiagarajan
Vadivukkarasi
Silk Smitha
Kamala Kamesh
Senthil

Production 
The song "Sevvarali Thottathula" was filmed at Vaigai Dam, Theni.

Soundtrack 
The music was composed by Ilaiyaraaja.

Reception 
Jeyamanmadhan of Kalki gave the film a mixed review, but appreciated the music.

References

External links 
 

1980s Tamil-language films
1983 films
Films directed by R. Selvaraj (screenwriter)
Films scored by Ilaiyaraaja